The Tees Transporter Bridge, also referred to as the Middlesbrough Transporter Bridge, is a bridge straddling the crossing points of the River Tees borders between Port Clarence in County Durham and Middlehaven in North Yorkshire, North East England. It is the furthest downstream bridge across the River Tees and the longest remaining transporter in the world. The bridge is grade II* listed and its winch house and piers are grade II listed.

 the bridge is not operational. When working, it carries a travelling 'car', or 'gondola', suspended below the fixed structure, across the river in 90 seconds. The gondola can carry 200 people, 9 cars, or 6 cars and one minibus. The bridge connects Middlesbrough, on the south bank, to Stockton on Tees, on the north bank and carries the A178 road from Middlesbrough to Hartlepool.

History 
The idea of a transporter bridge across the River Tees was first mooted in 1872 when Charles Smith, Manager of the Hartlepool Iron Works, submitted a scheme to Middlesbrough Corporation. However, the scheme was not pursued, and it would not be until the new century that the idea of a transporter bridge across the river would again be revisited. Following a 1907 Act of Parliament the Bridge was built at a cost of £68,026 6s 8d (equivalent to £ in  values), by Sir William Arrol & Co. of Glasgow between 1910 and 1911 to replace the 'Hugh Bell' and 'Erimus' steam ferry services. A transporter bridge was chosen because Parliament ruled that the new scheme of crossing the river had to avoid affecting the river navigation. 

Construction work started in July 1909 with caissons being used to allow workers to dig down to bedrock. The shafts that had been dug out by this process were then filled with concrete. The formal laying of the foundation stones, made of Aberdeen granite, took place in August 1910 when they were laid by Mayor of Middlesbrough Thomas Gibson-Poole and Alderman Joseph McLauchlan, the initiator of the transporter bridge scheme. The opening ceremony on 17 October 1911 was performed by Prince Arthur of Connaught. At its opening the bridge was painted red.

During the First World War Middlesbrough was bombed by an L11 Zeppelin in April 1916. During this raid it was reported that a bomb fell through the structure before hitting the river below. During the Second World War the superstructure of the bridge was hit by a bomb. In 1953, the gondola got stuck half-way. While it was stuck, gale force winds lashed water to within inches of it; despite this the bridge continued to operate.

In 1961 the bridge was painted blue.

In 1974, the comedy actor Terry Scott, travelling between his hotel in Middlesbrough and a performance at the Billingham Forum, mistook the bridge for a regular toll crossing and drove his Jaguar off the end of the roadway, landing in the safety netting beneath.

In December 1993, the bridge was awarded the Institution of Mechanical Engineers' highest honour, The Heritage Plaque, for engineering excellence, in recognition of the Council's efforts in keeping the bridge in good working order. Its historical importance was also recognised in 1985 by its listing as a Grade II* Listed Building and its prominence as a local landmark was further enhanced in 1993 by the installation of floodlights that operate during the winter months.

In July 2000 a visitor centre was opened on land previously occupied by the bridge workshop

In 2011 the Tees Transporter Bridge received a £2.6 million Heritage Lottery Fund award for improvement and renovation work to mark the Bridge's centenary. The improvement works include the installation of a glass viewing lift to the landmark's upper walkway and renovation of the gondola.

The bridge was closed on 27 August 2013 for 40 days repainting. It was then discovered that repairs were needed. In the same year, the Tees Transporter Bridge Anniversary Award was inaugurated as part of the Transporter Bridge's Heritage Lottery Fund-supported Visitor Experience Project in partnership with the Chartered Institution of Highways & Transportation (CIHT) and Teesside University. The inaugural award winner was Stephen Brown in autumn 2013, with Jason Dunnett receiving the accolade in autumn 2014.

On 5 March 2015, the Royal Mail issued a set of 10 First Class postage stamps featuring iconic British bridges including the Tees Transporter Bridge. The bridge was re-opened for traffic on 6 April 2015, but improvement work continued with the bridge still in daily use. These were completed in September 2015 after more than £4 million had been spent on the structure.

In August 2019, the bridge was temporarily closed due to safety concerns.

It is thought that repairs could cost up to £7 million and  it remains closed with its future under discussion.

Local culture

Locally, the bridge is often referred to simply as 'the Transporter'. The bridge hosts an annual vintage bus running day, organised by The 500 Group. On this one day per year, usually a Sunday in April, vintage buses take people on free rides around Teesside.  As part of the 2006 and 2007 events, the bridge made a special trip carrying a former Teesside Municipal Transport Daimler Fleetline, the first time a double-decker bus had used the bridge in 30 years.

It has been featured in films and TV programmes including Boys from the Blackstuff, Billy Elliot, The Fast Show, Spender, Vera, and Steel River Blues. In the millennium celebrations of 2000, fireworks were fired from its length. The storyline of the third series of Auf Wiedersehen, Pet, saw the bridge dismantled to be sold to and re-erected in the US. The local council received calls from people worried that the bridge was really being pulled down, with the BBC adding a disclaimer on the end of the final episode of the series stating that 'The Transporter Bridge is still in Middlesbrough'.

See also
 Newport Transporter Bridge – a similar bridge in South East Wales;
 Tees Newport Bridge – a vertical-lift bridge upstream of Middlesbrough. 
 Warrington Transporter Bridge – a similar bridge in North West England, now disused.

References 

 Anon. (1911) "The transporter bridge over the River Tees", The Engineer, 112 (September)
 Fernández Troyano, Leonardo (2003) Bridge engineering : a global perspective [Tierra sobre el agua], London : Thomas Telford, 
 Prade, Marcel (1988) Ponts et viaducs au XIXe siècle, Poitiers (France) : Brissaud, 
 Prade, Marcel (1990) Les grands ponts du monde: Ponts remarquables d'Europe, Poitiers (France) : Brissaud, 
 Woodhouse, Robert (2009) Tees Valley Curiosities, Stroud, Gloucestershire : The History Press,

External links 

 Middlesbrough Council official Transporter Bridge page
 Middlesbrough Council – Transporter Bridge friends and volunteers
 The Middlesbrough Transporter Bridge at BBC Tees
 

Transporter bridges
Bridges in County Durham
Bridges in North Yorkshire
Transporter Bridge
Crossings of the River Tees
Grade II* listed buildings in North Yorkshire
Bridges completed in 1911
Buildings and structures in Middlesbrough
Toll bridges in England
1911 establishments in England
Grade II* listed bridges in England